Back Into Blue is the third studio album by American pop rock band Quarterflash, released in 1985 by Geffen Records. Released with more of a synth-pop/soft rock edge compared to the sound of the band's previous releases, the album peaked at #150 on the U.S. charts. Two commercial singles were released from the album, "Talk To Me" and "Walking On Ice" - the former reached #41 on the American charts and was the group's last charting single, whereas the latter was released with a music video but failed to chart. The album sold around 250,000 copies.

Track listing
All songs written by Marv Ross and Rindy Ross, except for where noted.

Side one
 "Walking On Ice" (Marv Ross)  – 3:48
 "Caught In The Rain" – 4:55
 "Back Into Blue" – 4:27
 "Talk To Me" – 5:00
 "I Want To Believe It's You" – 3:52

Side two
"Love Without A Net (You Keep Falling)" (Marv Ross, Rindy Ross, Rich Gooch)   – 4:09
 "Come To Me"  (Marv Ross, Rindy Ross, Daniel Brandt, Brian David Willis) – 3:21
 "Grace Under Fire"  (Marv Ross) – 5:26
 "Just For You" – 4:59
 "Welcome To The City" – 4:11

Personnel
 Rindy Ross — vocals; saxophone
 Marv Ross — guitars
 Daniel Brandt — keyboards
 Rich Gooch — bass
 Brian David Willis — drums; percussion

References

External links

Quarterflash albums
1985 albums
Albums produced by Steve Levine
Geffen Records albums